John Browne (1 October 1936 – 27 March 2019) was an Irish Fine Gael politician who served as a Teachta Dála (TD) for the Carlow–Kilkenny constituency from 1989 to 2002. He served as a Senator from 1983 to 1987.

Biography
A former teacher, he was appointed to Seanad Éireann as Senator in 1983 by the Taoiseach Garret FitzGerald, but he was not returned again after Fine Gael lost power following the 1987 general election.

Browne was first elected to Dáil Éireann as a Fine Gael TD at the 1989 general election and retained his seat at the 1992 and 1997 general elections, before retiring at the 2002 general election.

His son Fergal Browne also served as a Senator.

See also
Families in the Oireachtas

References

1936 births
2019 deaths
Local councillors in County Carlow
Fine Gael TDs
Irish schoolteachers
Members of the 17th Seanad
Members of the 26th Dáil
Members of the 27th Dáil
Members of the 28th Dáil
Nominated members of Seanad Éireann
Fine Gael senators